The men's competition in the middleweight (– 77 kg) division was held on 9–10 November 2011.

Schedule

Medalists

Records

Results

References

(Pages 43, 45, 47 & 49) Start List 
2011 IWF World Championships Results Book Pages 38–40 
Results 

2011 World Weightlifting Championships